Glenea lambii is a species of beetle in the family Cerambycidae. It was described by Francis Polkinghorne Pascoe in 1866, originally under the genus Tanylecta. It is known from Malaysia.

References

lambii
Beetles described in 1866